Haghtanak (also, Haght’anak, Akhtanak, and Chorort Gyukh) is a neighbourhood in the Yerevan Province of Armenia.

References 

Populated places in Yerevan